The UKeiG Strix award is an annual award for outstanding contributions to the field of information retrieval and is presented in memory of Dr Tony Kent, a past Fellow of the Institute of Information Scientists (IIS), who died in 1997. Tony Kent made a major contribution to the development of information science and information services both in the UK and internationally, particularly in the field of chemistry. The name 'Strix' was chosen to reflect Tony's interest in ornithology, and as the name of the last and most successful information retrieval packages that he created.

The Award is made in partnership with the International Society for Knowledge Organisation UK (ISKO UK), the Royal Society of Chemistry Chemical Information and Computer Applications Group (RSC ) and the British Computer Society Information Retrieval Specialist Group (BCS IRSG).

The Strix Award is given in recognition of an outstanding contribution to the field of information retrieval that meets one of the following criteria:

 a major and/or sustained contribution to the theoretical or experimental understanding of the information retrieval process;
 development of, or significant improvement in, mechanisms, a product or service for the retrieval of information, either generally or in a specialised field;
 development of, or significant improvement in, ease of access to an information service;
 a sustained contribution over a period of years to the field of information retrieval; for example, by running an information service or by contributing at national or international level to organisations active in the field.

Recipients
Recipients so far have been:
Source: 
 1998: Prof Stephen Robertson
 1999: Dr Donna Harman
 2000: Dr Martin Porter
 2001: Prof Peter Willett
 2002: Malcolm Jones
 2003: Dr Herbert Van de Sompel
 2004: Prof C. J. 'Keith' van Rijsbergen
 2005: Jack Mills
 2006: Stella Dextre Clarke
 2007: Mats Lindquist
 2008: Prof Kalervo Jarvelin
 2009: Carol Ann Peters
 2010: Michael Lynch
 2011: Prof Alan Smeaton
 2012: Doug Cutting and David Hawking
 2013: Prof W. Bruce Croft
 2014: Dr Susan Dumais
 2015: Prof Peter Ingwersen
 2016: Prof Maristella Agosti
 2017: Prof Maarten de Rijke
 2018: Prof Pia Borlund
 2019: Prof Ingemar J. Cox
 2020: Prof Ian Ruthven
 2021: no award made
 2022: Prof Iadh Ounis and Dr Ryen White

Since 2014, the winner of the Tony Kent Strix Award in year _n_ is giving the Tony Kent Strix Annual Lecture in year _n+1_.  Annual lectures so far:

 2015: Dr Susan Dumais on "Understanding and Improving Search using Large-Scale Behavioural Data" 
 2016: Prof Peter Ingwersen on "Context in Interactive IR" 
 2017: Prof Maristella Agosti on "Behind the Scenes of Research and Innovation" 
 2018: Prof Maarten de Rijke will give the fourth annual lecture in this series.

UKeiG is a special interest group of the Chartered Institute of Library and Information Professionals.

See also
 List of computer science awards

References

External links
The Tony Kent Strix Award, offered by UKeiG
UKeiG
CILIP

Strix